Mar dulce is an album by the Argentine/Uruguayan tango fusion band, Bajofondo.

The album was recorded in Buenos Aires, Argentina, In the first phase, double bass, violin, bandoneon, guitar and piano were recorded, then strings orchestra under the direction of Alejandro Terán. Later, acoustic drums were recorded in Los Angeles. Different guest artists recorded their parts in New York City, Los Angeles, Tokyo, Montevideo and Madrid.

Guest artists on this release are Nelly Furtado, Julieta Venegas, Lágrima Ríos (performing her last record in lifetime "Chiquilines" written specially for her by Gustavo Santaolalla), Gustavo Cerati, Mala Rodríguez, Fernando Santullo (former member of Peyote Asesino), Juan Subirá (member of Bersuit Vergarabat, with a song written by himself) and the Japanese bandoneonist Ryōta Komatsu collaborating on the album's first single, "Pa' Bailar".

Track lists

Notes

References 
Mar Dulce on Juno Records store

Bajofondo albums
2007 albums
2008 albums